Lee Hyun-il (born 17 April 1980) is a former badminton player from South Korea. He is a former World and Asian Championships bronze medalist, and was part of South Korean team that won the 2003 Sudirman Cup as well the gold medals at the 2002 and 2014 Asian Games.

Career

2002 Asian Games 
Lee competed in the 2002 Asian Games where he showed signs of promise as an ace singles player for team Korea. In the men's team event, Lee dominated the opponents he faced in the tourney, completing all three matches less than 30 minutes and allowing only seven points in the semifinals and eight in the final. Team Korea eventually won their first men's team gold medal since 1986 when Park Joo-bong and Kim Moon-soo led the team.

2003 Sudirman Cup 
At the 2003 Sudirman Cup held in Eindhoven, the Netherlands, Lee helped his team to win its third Sudirman Cup title, winning all three singles matches. Though many great doubles players from South Korea had won numerous international competitions, team Korea had always struggled to win the Thomas and Sudirman Cup competitions due to the lack of top men's singles players. However, Lee, the winner of the 2003 Swiss Open, showed spectacular performances through the Sudirman Cup tournament, not dropping a single set. In the semifinal, Lee defeated 2001 World Championship runner-up and 2001 All England Open semifinalist Peter Gade 2-0, which led his team to a 3-2 victory over Denmark. Lee won another 2-0 upset victory over world number one ranked Chen Hong in game 1 of the South Korea's final team event against China.

2004 Olympics 
Lee competed in the 2004 Summer Olympics, which was his first Olympic appearance. Lee easily defeated Stuart Brehaut of Australia in the first round. However, he was surprisingly eliminated in the second round by Boonsak Ponsana of Thailand.

2006 
At the 2006 IBF World Championships held in Madrid, Spain, Lee captured his first World Championship medal in the men's singles event. He defeated Chetan Anand, Jan Fröhlich, Eric Pang and Chen Jin before losing to Bao Chunlai of China in the semifinals.

2008 Olympics 
In 2008, he defeated top rank players Lin Dan and Lee Chong Wei in the Korea Open. He participated in the Beijing Olympics, where he reached the semi-finals before being defeated by world number one, Lee Chong Wei from Malaysia, and then being beaten by Chen Jin of China in the bronze-medal playoff.

Retirement and comeback 
After the 2008 Olympics, Lee announced his retirement from international badminton and only competed in national competitions. However, in April 2010 he came out of retirement after much persuasion from the coach and teammates to fill the void of singles players in the Korean national squad. In May 2010, Lee participated in the 2010 Thomas Cup and played in two singles matches.

2012 Summer Olympics 
Lee lost to Chinese Chen Long in the badminton bronze-medal playoff on 5 August 2012.

2019 
Lee who joined the Miryang City Hall team since 2018, decided to retire from the team on 22 November 2019.

Achievements

World Championships 
Men's singles

Asian Games 
Men's singles

Asian Championships 
Men's singles

Asian Junior Championships 
Boys' singles

BWF World Tour (1 title) 
The BWF World Tour, announced on 19 March 2017 and implemented in 2018, is a series of elite badminton tournaments, sanctioned by Badminton World Federation (BWF). The BWF World Tour are divided into six levels, namely World Tour Finals, Super 1000, Super 750, Super 500, Super 300 (part of the HSBC World Tour), and the BWF Tour Super 100.

Men's singles

BWF Superseries (1 title, 3 runners-up) 
The BWF Superseries, launched on 14 December 2006 and implemented in 2007, is a series of elite badminton tournaments, sanctioned by Badminton World Federation (BWF). BWF Superseries has two level such as Superseries and Superseries Premier. A season of Superseries features twelve tournaments around the world, which introduced since 2011, with successful players invited to the Superseries Finals held at the year end.

Men's singles

  BWF Superseries Finals tournament
  BWF Superseries Premier tournament
  BWF Superseries tournament

BWF Grand Prix (18 titles, 11 runners-up) 
The BWF Grand Prix had two levels, the BWF Grand Prix and Grand Prix Gold. It was a series of badminton tournaments sanctioned by the Badminton World Federation (BWF) which was held from 2007 to 2017. The World Badminton Grand Prix has been sanctioned by the International Badminton Federation from 1983 to 2006.

Men's singles

  BWF Grand Prix Gold tournament
  BWF & IBF Grand Prix tournament

BWF International Challenge/Series (5 titles, 3 runners-up) 
Men's singles

  BWF International Challenge tournament
  BWF International Series tournament

References

External links 

 
 

1980 births
Living people
Badminton players from Seoul
South Korean male badminton players
Badminton players at the 2004 Summer Olympics
Badminton players at the 2008 Summer Olympics
Badminton players at the 2012 Summer Olympics
Olympic badminton players of South Korea
Badminton players at the 2002 Asian Games
Badminton players at the 2006 Asian Games
Badminton players at the 2010 Asian Games
Badminton players at the 2014 Asian Games
Asian Games gold medalists for South Korea
Asian Games silver medalists for South Korea
Asian Games bronze medalists for South Korea
Asian Games medalists in badminton
Medalists at the 2002 Asian Games
Medalists at the 2006 Asian Games
Medalists at the 2010 Asian Games
Medalists at the 2014 Asian Games
World No. 1 badminton players